Nipponoparmelia is a genus of five species of lichen belonging to the family Parmeliaceae. Nipponoparmelia was originally conceived by Syo Kurokawa as a subgenus of the genus Parmelia in 1994. It was raised to generic status in 2010. Four east Asian species were originally placed in the genus; Nipponoparmelia perplicata, found in South Korea and Russia, was added in 2014.

Description
Nipponoparmelia differs morphologically from Parmelia by having very small (punctiform) pseudocyphellae on the margins of the lobes and lobules. Similar to the genera Punctelia and Flavopunctelia, the pseudocyphellae lack a persistent epicortex roof and do not form angular or linear pore aggregates; unlike these two genera, however, in Nipponoparmelia the pseudocyphellae are not present on the lamina.

Species
Nipponoparmelia isidioclada (Vain.) K.H.Moon, Y.Ohmura & Kashiw. (2010)
Nipponoparmelia laevior (Nyl.) K.H.Moon, Y.Ohmura & Kashiw. (2010)
Nipponoparmelia perplicata S.Y.Kondr., Tschab., Elix & Hur (2014)
Nipponoparmelia pseudolaevior (Asahina) K.H.Moon, Y.Ohmura & Kashiw. (2010)
Nipponoparmelia ricasolioides (Nyl.) A.Crespo & Divakar (2010)

References

Parmeliaceae
Lichen genera
Lecanorales genera
Taxa described in 1994
Taxa named by Syo Kurokawa